Sinchana D. Gowda is an Indian surfer. She won the second position in the international surfing championship held in Chennai in 2014. Sinchana is one of the top-seeded women surfers of India.

References

External links
 https://www.sportskeeda.com/surfing/chennai-surfers-dominate-day-two-of-the-indian-open-of-surfing-2017
 https://www.hometownlife.com/story/sports/2019/08/07/canton-roller-skating-club-brings-home-seven-medals-nationals/1933127001/

Indian sportspeople
Indian surfers
People from Dakshina Kannada district
Living people
Year of birth missing (living people)
21st-century Indian women
Female surfers